Paradise Regained is a poem by English poet John Milton, first published in 1671. The volume in which it appeared also contained the poet's closet drama Samson Agonistes. Paradise Regained is connected by name to his earlier and more famous epic poem Paradise Lost, with which it shares similar theological themes; indeed, its title, its use of blank verse, and its progression through Christian history recall the earlier work. However, this effort deals primarily with the temptation of Christ as recounted in the Gospel of Luke.

Milton composed Paradise Regained at his cottage in Chalfont St Giles in Buckinghamshire. Paradise Regained is four books long and comprises 2,065 lines; in contrast, Paradise Lost is twelve books long and comprises 10,565 lines. As such, Barbara K. Lewalski has labelled the work a "brief epic".

Plot

Book 1
Jesus is baptized by John. Satan, seeing this, calls a meeting of demons to plot against him, confident he can fool Christ as he fooled Adam.
Meanwhile God tells the angels Satan is overconfident, and they sing God's praise.

Jesus enters the wilderness and fasts there for 40 days, pondering His past and future. A seeming old man of the desert asks him as Son of God to turn stones into bread. Jesus, recognizing Satan, rebukes him for his lies. Satan pretends to be delighted to hear truth and begs permission to stay. Jesus says he can do whatever the Father in heaven allows. Night falls.

Book 2
Simon and Andrew saw Jesus baptized and realize He is Messiah, but lose Him and search for Him. They worry they have lost Him for good. Mary too wonders what has become of her Son, remembering that she lost him once before when He was 12.
Satan returns to his demons, warning them this temptation is going to be far more difficult than the Fall of man. Belial advises using a honey trap, but Satan knows this will not work, thinking pride a stronger test.

Jesus, hungry, dreams of Elijah being fed by ravens. Waking, he finds a fair man and a banquet waiting for Him, but He again resists. Satan next tries to tempt with money, but Jesus reminds him that King David started as a mere shepherd.

Book 3
Satan flatters Christ, praising His wisdom, then taunts Him with his lack of achievement, saying Alexander the Great had conquered half the world at 30. Jesus rejects gaining glory by violent means. Satan next tries goading him with duty, saying Judas Maccabeus gained glory for God by fighting the pagans. But Jesus sees suffering as the path he must tread.

Satan then takes Christ to a high mountain, showing Him the kingdoms of the world. He suggests He will need an alliance with the Parthians if He is to resist Rome successfully. Christ refuses Satan's suggestion to free the Ten Tribes, leaving it to Divine providence.

Book 4
Satan next shows Christ Rome, and offers it to Him. Christ once more rejects. Satan says all the kingdoms of the world are his to bestow if only Christ will bow the knee. Christs rebukes him for this blasphemy, quoting Exodus chapter 20.

Satan, realizing he is defeated, makes an attempt to interest Christ in the wisdom of Ancient Greece. But Jesus rejects this in favour of the Psalms and the Prophets. Satan angrily returns Christ to the wilderness and forces him to spend a cold night in the middle of a Tempest amid hellish furies. Christ endures this. Satan, frustrated, takes Christ to Jerusalem and tells him to throw himself off the pinnacle of the Jewish Temple, quoting a Psalm. Jesus quotes back, "Tempt not the Lord thy God". Satan falls. Angels help Jesus, singing of his victory over the devil, feeding Him, and returning him to Mary.

Analysis

Whereas Paradise Lost is ornate in style and decorative in its verse, Paradise Regained is carried out in a fairly plain style. Specifically, Milton reduces his use of simile and deploys a simpler syntax in Paradise Regained than he does in Paradise Lost, and this is consistent with Biblical descriptions of Jesus's plainness in his life and teachings (in the epic, he prefers Hebrew Psalms to Greek poetry). Modern editors believe the simpler style of Paradise Regained evinces Milton's poetic maturity. This is not to say that the poem bears no affinities with Milton's earlier work, but scholars continue to agree with Northrop Frye's suggestion that Paradise Regained is "practically sui generis" in its poetic execution.

One major concept emphasized throughout Paradise Regained is the idea of reversals. As implied by its title, Milton sets out to reverse the "loss" of Paradise. Thus, antonyms are often found next to each other, reinforcing the idea that everything that was lost in the first epic will be regained by the end of this "brief epic". Additionally, the work focuses on the idea of "hunger", both in a literal and in a spiritual sense. After wandering in the wilderness for forty days, Jesus is starving for food. Satan, too blind to see any non-literal meanings of the term, offers Christ food and various other temptations, but Jesus continually denies him. Although Milton's Jesus is remarkably human, an exclusive focus on this dimension of his character obscures the divine stakes of Jesus's confrontation with Satan; Jesus emerges victorious, and Satan falls, amazed.

An interesting anecdote recounted by a Quaker named Thomas Ellwood provides some insight into Paradise Regaineds development. After studying Latin with Milton and reading the poet's epic Paradise Lost, Ellwood remarked, "Thou hast said much here of Paradise lost, but what hast thou to say of Paradise found?" Hearing this, Milton at first "sat some time in a muse" before changing the subject; however, sometime thereafter he showed to Ellwood a new manuscript entitled Paradise Regained. Some maintain that although he seemed to express gratitude to Ellwood in a letter, Milton in truth "passed on a friendly if impish fabrication" that made Ellwood feel like the inspiration for the poem.<ref>"Introduction to Paradise Regained, in Complete Poetry, 631.</ref>

Notes

References
 Northrop Frye, The Return to Eden: Five Essays on Milton's Epics (Toronto: Toronto UP, 1965).
 Introduction to Paradise Regained, in The Complete Poetry and Essential Prose of John Milton, ed. William Kerrigan, John Rumrich, and Stephen M. Fallon (New York: Modern Library, 2007).
 Barbara Lewalski, Milton's Brief Epic: The Genre, Meaning, and Art of Paradise Regained (Providence: Brown UP, 1966).
 Susanne Woods, introduction to Paradise Lost & Paradise Regained'', published by Signet Classics.

External links

 
 E-text from the John Milton Reading Room
 
 "Symbolism in Paradise Regained" by Gilbert McInnis

1671 books
1671 poems
Christian poetry
Epic poems in English
Poetry by John Milton
Fiction about the Devil
Depictions of Jesus in literature
Temptation of Christ
Works based on the New Testament